Úlfarsson is an Icelandic patronymic surname, which means son of Úlfar.

 Gaukur Úlfarsson (born 1973), Icelandic filmmaker and film director
 Thorleifur Úlfarsson (born 2000), Icelandic footballer

Patronymic surnames
Icelandic-language surnames